Angelos Abdel Chanti (born 7 September 1989), known in Jordan as Malek Shehadeh Ahmad Abdel-Hadi, is a Greek-born Jordanian professional footballer who plays as an attacking midfielder for Panachaiki  and the Jordan national team.

Club career

Early years
Chanti was born in Pyrgos, Elis to a Jordanian father and a Greek mother. He started playing youth football in Paniliakos of his hometown, before moving to Athens to attend Juan Ramón Rocha's football academy. He eventually signed his first professional contract abroad, joining Slovak First League side AS Trenčín in 2008. He played in 11 matches of the Slovak Corgoň Liga during his debut season, and followed the club to the Slovak First League after its relegation at the end of the 2007–08 season. He then returned to his country of birth Greece in January 2010, and joined Gamma Ethniki side Olympiakos Chersonissos, signing a 6-month contract.

Ergotelis
After impressing with his performances in the Gamma Ethniki, Chanti signed a 5-year contract with Super League side Ergotelis in 2010. He spent the next two season struggling to establish himself as a starter, but eventually solidified his place at the club's starting lineup during Ergotelis' short stay in the Football League during the 2012–13 season. In total, he made 34 league appearances and scored 4 goals, thus greatly contributing to the club's 2nd-place finish and swift return to the Superleague. Chanti played for the Cretans in top-flight for two more seasons, and was appointed vice-captain of the team during his final season. In the summer transfer window of 2015, after Ergotelis was again relegated to the Football League, Chanti decided to move on. During his 5-year tenure with the club, Chanti summed up a total of 102 appearances and scored 11 goals in all competitions.

Iraklis
In June 2015, Chanti signed a two-year contract with the newly promoted Superleague club Iraklis. However, as he was not gaining enough playing time, Chanti was released from his contract with Iraklis in January 2016.

OFI
After leaving Iraklis, Chanti returned to Crete, signing with ex-Superleage side OFI in the Gamma Ethniki, the third tier of the Greek football league system. He contributed to the club's dynamic comeback to win the Group 4 championship with 4 goals in 14 appearances, and became a regular starter during the club's next two seasons in the Football League. His performances with OFI did not go unnoticed and on December 2017 he received his first call-up by the Jordanian national football team. However, as the club came to know financial instability at the end of 2017, Chanti freed himself from his contract in January 2018, when he filed a claim against the club for several months of unpaid wages.

Aris
On 29 January 2018, Chanti signed a contract with fellow Football League title contenders Aris until the end of the season. On 12 March 2018 he scored his first goal with a beautiful free-kick in a 3-0 home win against his former club Ergotelis.

Aittitos Spata
On 10 September 2018, he signed a contract with newly promoted side Aittitos Spata on a free transfer.

Luftëtari Gjirokastër
Chanti moved to Albania and signed with Luftëtari Gjirokastër on 24 January 2019.

International career
Due to his dual citizenship, Chanti was eligible to play for either the Greek or the Jordanian national football team. On 7 December 2017 Chanti received, and accepted an offer to represent Jordan.
He made his debut on 25 December 2017 in a friendly 1-1 against Libya.

Career statistics

Club

International

International goals

Honours
OFI
 Gamma Ethniki: 2015–16

References

External links
  Player Profile
 UEFA Report
 Profile at Onsports.gr

1989 births
Living people
Jordanian footballers
Jordan international footballers
Jordanian people of Greek descent
Greek footballers
Greek people of Jordanian descent
Super League Greece players
Football League (Greece) players
Slovak Super Liga players
Kategoria Superiore players
VSV TONEGIDO players
AS Trenčín players
Ergotelis F.C. players
Iraklis Thessaloniki F.C. players
OFI Crete F.C. players
Aris Thessaloniki F.C. players
Hersonissos F.C. players
Aittitos Spata F.C. players
Kavala F.C. players
O.F. Ierapetra F.C. players
Egaleo F.C. players
Panachaiki F.C. players
Luftëtari Gjirokastër players
Jordanian expatriate footballers
Expatriate footballers in Slovakia
Expatriate footballers in Albania
Expatriate footballers in Greece
Jordanian expatriate sportspeople in Albania
Jordanian expatriate sportspeople in Slovakia
Jordanian expatriate sportspeople in Greece
Association football midfielders
Footballers from Pyrgos, Elis